Arata Kanoh (Japanese: 加納新太, Kanō Arata) is a Japanese novelist from Aichi Prefecture. He graduated from the Aichi Prefectural University.

Works 
Kanoh has written numerous novels throughout his career, many of which are book adaptations of Shinkai movies such as:

 Your Name. Another Side:Earthbound
 The Garden of Words
 5 Centimeters per Second: one more side
 The Place Promised in Our Early Days

He was also a screenplay assistant for the award-winning anime Your Name.

References 

Japanese novelists
People from Aichi Prefecture
Year of birth missing (living people)
Living people
Aichi Prefectural University alumni